The Lumières Award for Best First Film is an award presented annually by the Académie des Lumières since 2014.

Winners and nominees
In the following lists, the titles and names with a blue background are the winners and recipients respectively; those not in bold are the nominees.

2010s

2020s

See also
César Award for Best First Feature Film
Louis Delluc Prize for Best First Film
Prix du Syndicat Français de la Critique de Cinéma — Best First Film

External links 
 Lumières Award for Best First Film at AlloCiné

Best First Film
Directorial debut film awards